Sanctuary Tour is a concert tour, predominantly acoustic, by Dutch symphonic rock band Within Temptation in support of their fifth studio album, The Unforgiving, released by Roadrunner Records on 25 March 2011. This is their eight tour and the third passing over theaters.

Background
On 16 December, Within Temptation announced that their 2012 acoustic Dutch theatre shows would form part of The Unforgiving Tour, featuring electric renditions of the album's songs. On the first of March 2012, the band announced that the acoustic performances will be called the Sanctuary Tour, and will have a concept. Den Adel stated in the band official website that "When selecting and listening to our songs we noticed how well they fit together and how much they have in common, both stylistically and lyrically. More and more, we also realized that by putting these songs in a certain order we were actually creating a story. As the visuals and movies we use during our shows have become a bigger and bigger part of our shows, this new story gave us the perfect opportunity to create new film material. This not only shows the story line visually, but supports the musical story as well."

Synopsis
Scotland. The Highlands, 1895. 
A young boy, sick, is lying in his bed. He has been there for days now, infected by an unknown virus causing a dangerous fever. As the fever gets stronger, his consciousness fades away, further and further from reality. He slips away into a dream world. He is a grown man now; a warrior or Holy man of some kind; strong and determined. Traveling the landscape, which is enchantingly familiar, yet surreal and unknown. Now and then, when the fever stabilizes for a short while, the real world shines through. Sometimes in forms and shapes that fit his dream world -his mother, the doctor, the local priest… they all try to help him but seem powerless to do so. Though tempting, he is not quite ready to stay in this sanctuary, not ready to say goodbye… and so he travels on and on… searching for a way out. A price has to be paid...

Setlist

Tour dates 

 1^ Sold out

Personnel

Within Temptation
Sharon den Adel – vocals
Stefan Helleblad – rhythm guitar
Ruud Jolie – lead guitar
Martijn Spierenburg – keyboards
Jeroen van Veen – bass guitar
Mike Coolen – drums

Guest musicians
Jonas Pap – cello
Isabella Scholten – vocals on "Our Farewell" (played on tape)
Robert Westerholt – guitar at Tilburg show

References

External links
Within Temptation Official Website
Within Temptation Tour Dates
Within Temptation Tour Archive

2012 concert tours
Within Temptation concert tours